Young Shoulders is a 1982 novel by John Wain. It portrays incompatibility in a marital relationship and how such a flawed marriage affects the children born out of it.  It won the 1982 Whitbread Prize.

References

1982 novels
Macmillan Publishers books